Gonzalo López-Gallego (born 27 June 1973) is a Spanish film director who is best known for his movie Apollo 18, a 2011 sci-fi thriller and horror film starring Warren Christie, Lloyd Owen, and Ryan Robbins.

Filmography

The King of the Mountain (2007)
La piel azul (2010)
Apollo 18 (2011)
Open Grave (2012)
The Hollow Point (2016)
Backdraft 2 (2019)

References

External links
 

Living people
Film directors from Madrid
1973 births